Laevicordia  is a genus of small carnivorous bivalves in the family Verticordiidae. It currently contains the single extant species L. abscissa and the fossil species L. orbiculata.

References 

Verticordiidae
Bivalve genera